The Antelope Hill Highway Bridge (also known as the Antelope Hill Bridge) is a historic bridge over the Gila River in Tacna, Arizona, U.S. It was built between 1914 ad 1915 as a ten-span concrete girder bridge. The bridge served as an integral piece of the Ocean to Ocean Highway between Yuma and Phoenix from 1915 to 1922, when it was bypassed by an alternate route through Gila Bend, paralleling the Gillespie Dam. The bridge and original highway were bypassed mainly due to damage caused by flooding along the river floodplain it was constructed on. After being repurposed for traffic traveling north from Yuma, the bridge was finally abandoned in 1929 following completion of the McPhaul Suspension Bridge. The ruins of the old bridge are currently listed on the National Register of Historic Places.

History
In 1912, Arizona state engineer Lamar Cobb surveyed two different locations to construct an auto bridge over the Gila River. One location was near the town of Dome while the other was located further east along the river at the base of Antelope Hill. Cobb chose the latter as the preferred site for a new bridge. This did not include the length of the approach spans to be constructed of timber trestle structures. In total, the new bridge would have 15 separate spans. Guard rails on the bridge would be constructed from steel piping.

Cobb opened competitive bidding for the bridge in December 1913. However, the state initially rejected every bid, wishing to use prison labor to construct the bridge instead of contracted labor. The bridge had to be redesigned when Cobb calculated there wasn't an adequate amount of manpower in the Arizona prison system to match the project's size. Having reworked his original plans, Cobb once again opened the project to competitive bidding, awarding the contract to an individual named Parry Borchers in 1914. Construction began in June 1914 but stopped soon afterward due to Borchers defaulting on his loans. Several months later, a winter flood badly damaged the incomplete structure. Borchers' failure to complete the project resulted in the state taking over construction and completing the bridge using prison labor. The Antelope Hill Highway Bridge was finally opened to traffic on August 18, 1915. The event was marked with a celebratory gala picnic attended by thousands of individuals.

The bridge was originally part of the main highway between Yuma and Phoenix, known as the Ocean to Ocean Highway. The route also carried several auto trails such as the Dixie Overland Highway, Bankhead Highway and Old Spanish Trail. It was partly rebuilt in 1917-1918 after the 1916 flood washed away the northern approach to the bridge; the modification added five more concrete spans and a wooden trestle. Washouts and destruction of the bridge by flooding were common due to its placement on a weak soil area along the Gila River floodplain. Damage to the bridge came to be expected every time a major flood event occurred on the lower Gila River. Two particularly large floods in November 1919 and February 1920 not only damaged the bridge but completely submerged it as well as washed out a large section of the highway it served. This led to the Arizona Highway Department deciding to construct an entirely different route to bypass the floodplain altogether. In 1922, construction of an alternate route through Gila Bend was completed. The new route crossed the Gila River with a concrete apron at the foot of the Gillespie Dam. The apron itself would be replaced five years later by the new Gillespie Dam Bridge. This effectively ended the purpose for which the Antelope Hill Highway Bridge was constructed. The alternate route became the new main highway to Phoenix and was designated as part of U.S. Route 80 in 1926. US 80 would later be replaced by Interstate 8.

Despite no longer being the main route between Yuma and Phoenix, the Antelope Hill Highway Bridge was still utilized as the main route for traffic traveling north from Yuma. However, costly flood damage continued, causing the Antelope Hill Highway Bridge to be completely abandoned in 1929. It was subsequently replaced by the McPhaul Suspension Bridge as the main north–south auto connection from Yuma. The new bridge later became part of U.S. Route 95 before being abandoned itself. Despite total abandonment, the Antelope Hill Highway Bridge has been listed on the National Register of Historic Places since June 28, 1979. Where the replacement McPhaul Bridge and Gillespie Dam Bridge are still intact, the years of flood damage and abandonment have left what remains of the Antelope Hill Highway Bridge in ruins. The Antelope Hill Highway Bridge remains can still be accessed by foot from Roll Road, but the path to the bridge is impassable to vehicles. The Antelope Hill Highway Bridge is one of only three surviving twin concrete girder bridges in Arizona, with the other two being the Santa Cruz Bridge and Hell Canyon Bridge.

See also
 Agua Caliente, Arizona – Ghost town once served by the bridge.
 Gillespie Dam Bridge
 Ocean to Ocean Bridge
 McPhaul Suspension Bridge
 Dixie Overland Highway
 Bankhead Highway
 Old Spanish Trail (auto trail)
 Antelope Hill, Arizona
 List of bridges on the National Register of Historic Places in Arizona
 National Register of Historic Places listings in Yuma County, Arizona

References

Road bridges on the National Register of Historic Places in Arizona
Bridges completed in 1915
Buildings and structures in Yuma County, Arizona
Bridges over the Gila River
Former road bridges in the United States
Concrete bridges in the United States
Girder bridges in the United States